The Duke blueberry, also known as Vaccinium 'Duke', is a cultivar of northern highbush blueberry released in 1987. It is a tetraploid cultivar, derived mostly from Vaccinium corymbosum with a 4 percent contribution of Vaccinium angustifolium. Its parentage includes the cultivars 'Ivanhoe' and 'Earliblue'

It has gained the Royal Horticultural Society's Award of Garden Merit.

References

Blueberries
Food plant cultivars